Hendrik Goeman Borgesius (11 January 1847, Schildwolde, Slochteren – 18 January 1917, The Hague) was a Dutch politician. He was a member of the House of Representatives of the Netherlands from 1877 until 1917, representing respectively Winschoten, Veendam, Zutphen, Enkhuizen, Rotterdam and finally Emmen. In 1885 he became leader of the Liberal Union. He was Minister of the Interior from 1897 to 1901 and was Speaker of the House of Representatives in the period from 17 September 1913 to 18 January 1917. After being a minister he became a member of the Council of State.

The University of Groningen gave him an honorary doctorate in medicine for his work concerning public health.

References
Mr.Dr. H. Goeman Borgesius at "Parlement & Politiek"
Biography in Biografisch Woordenboek van Nederland

External links
 

1847 births
1917 deaths
Ministers of the Interior of the Netherlands
People from Slochteren
Speakers of the House of Representatives (Netherlands)
University of Groningen alumni